The 2015–16 season was the Damash's 4th season in the Azadegan League, and their 2nd consecutive season in the 1st division of Iranian Football and 6th year in existence as a football club. They competed in the Hazfi Cup. Damash was captained by Mohammad Reza Mahdavi and Mostafa Hajati.

Player

First team squad
Last updated 16 May

Transfers

Summer 

In:

Out:

Winter 

In:

Out:

Squad statistics

Appearances & goals
Last updated 10 May 2016

|-
|}

See also
 2015–16 Azadegan League

References

External links
Persian League
  Damash Fans Press Site

Damash Gilan seasons
Damash